The first generation of the Chevrolet Silverado is a series of trucks manufactured by General Motors from 1998 until 2007 under the Chevrolet brand and also as the GMC Sierra. Built on the new GMT800 platform, the Silverado/Sierra 1500 and 2500 pickup trucks were first released in August 1998 as 1999 models. The "classic" light-duty GMT400 C/K trucks were kept in production alongside the new types for the first model year, while the Heavy-Duty GMT400 pickups (as well as the GMT400 SUVs) were continued until 2000, with the new GMT800 Silverado/Sierra HD (Heavy Duty) released in model year 2001. A small refresh for 2003 models was introduced in 2002, bringing slight design changes and an upgrade to the audio and HVAC controls. The 2007.5 GMT800 trucks, built after the new GMT900 had gone on sale, used the name Classic to denote the difference between the two generations.

Development
In January 1993, GM began development on the GMT800 pickup program with numerous teams coming together. A new design was chosen and finalized for production in June 1995, 36 months ahead of the scheduled start in June 1998. Development sign-off was issued in late 1997, with pre-production and series production commencement in June 1998.

Light duty
There are a number of models of light-duty Silverados and Sierras, including the half-ton, SS, and Hybrid.

The light-duty trucks use the 1500 name. They are available in three cab lengths, 2-door standard/regular cab, 3 or 4-door extended cab, and later, a front-hinged 4-door crew cab. The short box is only available with the crew cab and extended cab.

For the first year, only a regular cab and 3-door extended cab were available, along with the Vortec 4300 V6, Vortec 4800 V8, and the Vortec 5300 V8. In 2000, a driver's side door option became available for the extended cab, giving it four doors, and the crew-cab body was added to the lineup in 2004.

The Silverado Z71 got an optional lighter composite box, with a suspension package for towing, but lacked the high-output engine. The C3 became the Denali for 2002 (derived from the pre-existing 1999 GMC Yukon Denali), and Quadrasteer was added.

GM introduced a reworked version of the Silverado and Sierra in 2003, with a new front end and a slightly updated rear end. In 2006 the Silverado received another facelift, similar to the HD version introduced on 2005 HD models. In addition to that, Chevrolet has removed their own word scripting off the tailgate that was used from 1998 to 2005. Its SUV counterparts, the Suburban, Tahoe, and Yukon retained the use of the pre-facelift sheet metal. During the 2005 model year, all light-duty GMT800 pickups reverted to front disc/rear drum brakes as a cost-cutting measure; heavy duty trucks and the SUVs retained their 4-wheel disc brakes.

The Insurance Institute for Highway Safety (IIHS) gave the Silverado an overall "marginal" score on the frontal offset crash test for poor structural integrity and poor dummy control, although no injuries were recorded on the dummy's body regions.

2001 GMC Sierra C3/Denali

GMC created an upscale version of its Sierra 1500 in 2001 called the Sierra C3. It was coupled to a 4L60E-HD 4-speed automatic transmission along with other upscale equipment. For 2002, the name was changed to Sierra Denali, but the specifications remained essentially the same except for the addition of Quadrasteer and GM changed from the 4L60E-HD to the 4L65E in conjunction with a 4.10 final drive gear ratio.

The Denali is rated for towing  and hauling  in the cargo box.

The Sierra Denali was initially equipped with Delphi's Quadrasteer system as standard equipment. It was a 4-wheel steering system that greatly reduced the truck's turning radius and improved lane changing while towing. General Motors dropped Quadrasteer from the Sierra Denali after the 2004 model year and its entire lineup after 2005 due to poor sales of this expensive option.

Chevrolet Silverado SS

Launched in early 2003, the Silverado SS is a high-performance pickup truck built by Chevrolet. It is based on the Silverado 1500 Extended Cab with a Fleetside Box and features upgrades in the drivetrain and both exterior and interior appearance. This was the same engine used for the second generation Cadillac Escalade and GMC Yukon Denali. Chevrolet and GMC advertised this engine as the Vortec High Output and later as the "VortecMAX", while Cadillac calls it the "HO 6000". The SS debuted in 2003 with a standard All Wheel Drive setup with a 4.10 final drive gear ratio and 4-wheel disc brakes. In 2005, in an attempt to increase sales, a 2-wheel drive version became available (the 2WD SS also lost its rear disc brakes in favor of drums, as did the rest of the 1/2-ton GMT800s). 2005 was also the first year the sunroof was available in the SS line up. In 2006, the AWD variant was dropped, and the rear wheel drive was the only driveline layout available. In a further effort to reduce cost, buyers could also choose cloth interior and/or a bench seat. The Silverado SS also comes with the Z60 performance suspension and 20-inch aluminum wheels. All the SS trucks in both 2-wheel drive and AWD used the torsion bar style front suspension for better handling. SS themed trucks were only available from the factory in Black, Victory Red, and Arrival Blue Metallic from 2003 to 2004. In 2005, Arrival Blue Metallic was dropped from the color choices and replaced with Silver Birch Metallic.

Intimidator SS
In 2006, Chevrolet released a special edition Silverado SS under the name "Intimidator SS" (licensed by Dale Earnhardt, Inc.) to honor the late Dale Earnhardt.  The truck came with several minor appearance upgrades (rear spoiler, embroidered headrests, Intimidator custom badging), but was essentially a standard Silverado SS. Of the 1,033 scheduled trucks, only 933 were made (the remaining 100 were sold as 2007 Silverado SS "Classic" body style trucks before the 2007.5 MY changeover. These trucks were only available in Black exterior but could be ordered with cloth or leather interior.

Vortec High Output/Vortec Max

The Vortec High Output option was first introduced in 2004 to a limited market (mainly consisting of Texas and several surrounding areas); it was available nationwide for MY 2005. It was available for both the Chevy and GMC for 1500 series trucks. This special edition package (under option code B4V) included several options previously not found on the standard 1500 model, most notably the LQ9 6.0 L V8 engine (the same used for the Silverado SS, the Cadillac Escalade, and GMC Yukon Denali). The B4V package could only be ordered on extended cab standard box 2WD trucks. They were all built at the Canadian assembly plant and were equipped with the Z60 High Performance suspension package, in addition to the M32 = 4L65E transmission, GT4 = 3.73 rear gear, and G80 Gov Lock as standard equipment. The 2004 models were equipped with the standard 10 bolt 8.625 rear end. The 2005 models were upgraded with the larger 14 bolt 9.5 rear end under RPO option AXN. The package also included one style of the newly introduced GM 20-inch wheels installed from the factory. This marked the first time the LQ9 engine was available for a two-wheel drive application. Unlike the previous years with the SS Package, interior choices ranged from basic cloth to fully loaded. There were also more exterior color options available with this package.

In 2006, the Vortec Max trailering package became available. The Vortec Max package was added to the option list with an array of similar features and new badges, and at its core retained the LQ9/4L65-E powertrain.  However, the Vortec Max package differed from the Performance edition in that it also came with a variant of the Z85 Handling/Trailering suspension, as well as 17-inch wheels and tires under the option code NHT (and was available on 4x4 models in addition to 4x2 trucks) versus the Z60 High Performance Suspension and 20-inch wheel and tire package of the regular B4V (which was limited to 2-wheel drive trucks).  This was because the Vortec Max package was intended for max trailer towing, while the Performance Edition was intended more for customers who wanted the Silverado SS mechanicals without the visuals of the SS.  It was also made available (in addition to the extended cab) in the light-duty 4-door crew cab models.  Towing capacity with the VortecMax Trailing package was 10,800 pounds.

Hybrid

GM launched a hybrid version of the Silverado/Sierra in 2004, becoming the first ever GM hybrid passenger vehicle. Known within GM as the Parallel Hybrid Truck or PHT, it is not actually a parallel hybrid by the current definition, but a type of micro hybrid design. The electric motor housed within the transmission flywheel housing, serves only to provide engine cranking/starting, battery charging, and powering accessories. The engine automatically shuts down as the truck comes to a stop and uses 42 Volt electric power to the starter/generator unit to restart the engine as the brake pedal is released. Besides the typical 12 V automotive battery the PHT uses three additional 14 V valve regulated lead-acid (VRLA) batteries mounted under the rear seat to store and provide power. The truck uses a 5.3 L Vortec 5300 V8 for primary propulsion power. These trucks were also purchased back from customers for more than what they were worth in the late 2000s.

The PHT features four 120-volt 20 amp AC outlets, two in the bed and two inside the cab under the rear seat. These are particularly interesting to the building/construction contractor market, since they often require AC power when on the job. Additionally, the extra reserves of power for the accessories make this truck well-suited to that market, where trucks often sit at idle for hours at a time.

Availability was extremely limited at first, with commercial buyers getting the first allotment. Later in 2005, the truck was offered at retail in Alaska, California, Florida, Nevada, Oregon, Washington and Canada. For 2006–07 the truck was generally available to retail buyers throughout North America. The Parallel Hybrid Truck was discontinued for the 2008 model year with the release of the GMT900 truck line. Starting in 2009, General Motors offered a second-generation Chevrolet Silverado and GMC Sierra equipped with a Two-Mode Hybrid powertrain and CVT.

Heavy Duty

The HD variant is a heavy-duty truck. On Crew Cabs, they were a strengthened version of the Silverado/Sierra light-duty, and was available in the 1500HD, 2500HD, and 3500 models.

The 2500HD had an available five-speed (six-speed for 2006–2007 models) Allison 1000 transmission with the Vortec 8100 and 6.6L Duramax. The Silverado 3500 offered the same engines and transmissions that the 2500HD used. However, it was usually equipped with "dually" twin wheels at the rear and had a stronger suspension. The HD models were primarily used for towing and high-weight cargo. The Chevrolet Silverado 2500HD came in at #2 in a 2016 study by iSeeCars.com ranking the top 10  longest-lasting vehicles. The Silverado 2500HD had 5.7% of vehicles over 200,000 miles, according to the iSeeCars study.:)

For 2002, GMC introduced a new limited edition Sierra Professional. Built as either a 1500 or 2500HD Extended Cab Standard Box model with two and four-wheel-drive, the Professional was the ultimate contractor's truck. The center console area provided an area to store PDAs, cell phones and laptop computers as well as extra charging points for them and an area to hang file folders. There were also extra storage trays and larger cupholders throughout the cab, including one temperature controlled cupholder. The exterior featured lower body cladding, Professional badging, and a full-chrome grille. These trucks also featured a standard bedliner, box-rail protectors, in-bed power outlet, and many optional accessories suited to tradesmen (ladder racks, toolboxes, etc.). The 1500 series came standard with the 5.3L Vortec 5300 V8, but the 4.8L V8 could be ordered with an option credit if so desired. 2500HD models came with the 6.0L Vortec 6000 V8 only. All trucks had the four-speed automatic transmission with tow/haul mode. Customers could choose from either SLE or SLT decor. The base price for a 2002 1500 2WD with SLE decor was $29,591. 2003 was the final year the Professional was offered.

Other factors, such as options, can also affect these numbers.

Engines

2003 facelift 

For 2003, along with all GMT800-based full-size pickup trucks and SUVs, the Chevrolet Silverado and GMC Sierra models received a mid-cycle facelift. All Silverados and Sierras received a revised front end design, as well as new tail lamps, and most models also received new wheel designs. The interior was also redesigned, with a new dashboard design that included a new instrument cluster with an optional enhanced Driver Information Center (DIC), and a new four-spoke steering wheel. New audio system options for 2003 included newly-available XM Satellite Radio capabilities, as well as a Bose premium audio system, and an integrated six-disc CD changer. All trucks also received new front seats with new upholstery designs and color schemes. New for 2003 was a Work Truck (WT; or W/T) trim that was offered alongside the Base trim, and later became the new "Base model" Silverado and Sierra. The Silverado 1500 lineup received a new "SS" trim that included the 6.0L LQ9 Vortec V8 gasoline engine, while the LT model was divided into LT1, LT2, and LT3 trims. Other additions to the powertrain lineup for 2003 included a new E85 (FlexFuel)-capable version of the 5.3L Vortec V8 gasoline engine, which was available in non-California emissions states.

References 

Silverado 1
Motor vehicles manufactured in the United States
Pickup trucks
Cars introduced in 1998
2000s cars